Bico may refer to:

Bautek Bico, a German hang glider
Bico, Azerbaijan, a village and a municipality in Azerbaijan; English pronunciation of Azerbaijani "Bico" is "Bijo" 
Bico (Amares), a parish in Amares Municipality, Portugal
Bico (Paredes de Coura), a parish in the municipality of Paredes de Coura, Portugal
BICO is an abbreviation used for the British and Irish Communist Organisation
Bico Limited, a Barbadian ice cream company
The Bico Group, a bioconvergence startup

Biko (food), a Filipino dessert

See also

 Biko (disambiguation)
 BI (disambiguation)
 CO (disambiguation)